Ziaul Ahsan is a 2 Star rank Bangladesh Army officer. He is an incumbent Director General of National Telecommunication Monitoring Centre (NTMC). He previously served as additional director general (ADG) of Rapid Action Battalion (RAB). While he was serving as the additional director general of RAB, he was transferred as the DDG of Directorate General of Forces Intelligence (DGFI). Later, he was attached to NSI as the director (internal affairs).

Career

Army 
Ahsan joined Bangladesh Army as a commissioned officer on 21 June 1991. He was a graduate of BMA's 24th long course. He is a commando and skydiver.

Rapid Action Battalion 
Ahsan joined RAB-2 as its company commander on Mar 5, 2009. He was a major then. He was elevated to the rank of Lieutenant Colonel the same year and took charge as director of RAB's intelligence wing on Aug 27, 2010. He was made RAB's additional director general (operations) on Dec 7, 2013 after being promoted to Colonel . He is the only army official who has remained outside the Bangladesh Army for maximum period of time.

On 29 April 2014, Ahsan ordered  Lieutenant Colonel Tareque Sayeed and Major Arif Hossain to kill Narayanganj City Corporation councilor Nazrul Islam who had given the Seven Murders of the Narayanganj contract to Colonel Tareque. Ahsan denied any involvement with the whole affair.

Ahsan led a number of operations over last seven-and-a-half years. He played a role in the repatriation of Nur Hossain, main accused in the Narayanganj Seven Murder case from Kolkata. He was praised for his role in recovering Tk 160 million looted money, preventing theft and trade in newborns, drives against adulteration, and preserving wildlife by RAB in a press release.

Awards and recognition 
He was awarded the Bangladesh Police Medal (BPM) in 2010 and the President Police Medal (PPM) in 2011.

References 

Bangladesh Army generals
Year of birth missing (living people)
Living people